Kozlov's shrew (Sorex kozlovi) is a red-toothed shrew found only at the Mekong River, Tibet, China. It is listed as a data deficient species.

References

Sorex
Mammals of Asia
Mammals described in 1952